Carnival is a 1931 British drama film in black and white with colour sequences directed by Herbert Wilcox and produced by his British & Dominions Film Corporation, starring Matheson Lang, Joseph Schildkraut, Kay Hammond and Chili Bouchier. During a performance of Othello a jealous actor attempts to strangle his wife who he believes has committed adultery. It was a remake of the 1921 film Carnival. The French musician Alfred Rode appears with his band.

Cast
Matheson Lang as Silvio Steno 
 Chili Bouchier as Simonetta Steno 
 Joseph Schildkraut as Count Andrea Scipio 
	Lilian Braithwaite as Italia
	Kay Hammond as Nella 
 Brian Buchel as Lelio 
 Dickie Edwards as Nino 	
	Brember Wills as  Stage Manager 
	Alfred Rode and His Royal Tzigane Band as Performers at Carnival

References

Bibliography
 Low, Rachael. Filmmaking in 1930s Britain. George Allen & Unwin, 1985.
 Wood, Linda. British Films, 1927-1939. British Film Institute, 1986.

External links
 
Carnival at BFI Sreenonline

1931 films
1930s English-language films
1931 drama films
British drama films
Films directed by Herbert Wilcox
British black-and-white films
Remakes of British films
Sound film remakes of silent films
Films about actors
Films about theatre
Films based on Othello
British and Dominions Studios films
Films shot at Imperial Studios, Elstree
1930s British films